Tulio Quinteros (born 4 May 1963) is an Ecuadorian footballer. He played in seven matches for the Ecuador national football team from 1983 to 1989. He was also part of Ecuador's squad for the 1983 Copa América tournament.

References

1963 births
Living people
Ecuadorian footballers
Ecuador international footballers
Association football midfielders
Sportspeople from Esmeraldas, Ecuador